Jammin' in the Middle E is an Australia drama set amongst the Arab-Australian community in Sydney's West. The feature aired on 16 February 2006 on SBS.

Plot
The movie sheds light on the inhabitants of Western Sydney, an area known for its cultural diversity and in the eyes of some its ethnic related gang violence. It revolves around Naima (Julie Kanaan), her romantic interest Rafi (Matuse) and her brother Ishak (NOMISe) living their run-of-the-mill middle class conservative Lebanese Muslim existence. Sharief (Anthony Hawwa) is the film's standover man, a Lebanese youth gang leader who causes trouble for Ishak, his brother Musa (Mohamed Jajatieh) and cousin Hakim (Marouf Alameddine).

Cast
Ishak - NOMISe
Naima - Julie Kanaan
Rafi - Matuse
Said - Fadl Abdul Hay
Musa - Mohamed Jajatieh
Hakim - Marouf Alameddine
Grandma - Armida Croccolo
Thana - Susan Chamma
Sarwa - Elissar Mukhtar
Mom - Chadia Gedeon Hajjar
Sharief - Anthony Hawwa
Police Man - David Scott
Layla - Issra Jajatieh
Omar - Pino Scuro

Production
It was produced by Virus Media. The production received support from various organisations including the Australia Council, NSW Ministry for the Arts, Australian Film Commission, NSW Film and Television Office and SBSi.

Crew
Producer - Enda Murray
Director - Kim Mordaunt
Writer - Howard Jackson
Director of Photography - Joel Peterson 
Co-producer - Cinzia Guaraldi

External links
Official website
The Age review
SBS website
Arabic Pages article

Arab-Australian culture
Australian drama television series
Television shows set in New South Wales
Films about organised crime in Australia
Films directed by Kim Mordaunt